Sphenomorphus solomonis  is a species of skink found in the Admiralty Islands, the northern Moluccas, the Solomon Islands, New Guinea, and the Bismarck archipelago.

References

solomonis
Taxa named by George Albert Boulenger
Reptiles described in 1887
Skinks of New Guinea
Reptiles of the Solomon Islands